Saracens F.C., in the 2007-08 season, competed in the Guinness Premiership, the EDF Energy Cup and the Heineken Cup.

Transfers
Preparation for the 2007/08 seasons saw somewhat less activity in comings and goings from the squad, reflecting the relatively solid 2006/07 season. Among signings to date, specialist cover for Glen Jackson came in the form of Scotland fly half Gordon Ross, while South African utility back Brent Russell is highly regarded by many Springbok fans.

All Black second row Chris Jack joined Saracens after the 2007 World Cup.

In addition to external signings, a number of players going through Saracens' academy system made first team debuts, including a number during the time of the 2007 Rugby World Cup when injury problems left a number of senior players unavailable for selection.

Players in
  Matías Agüero (Rugby Viadana)
  Guthrie Hall (Sharks)
  Chris Jack (Canterbury Crusaders)
  Francisco Leonelli (Glasgow Warriors)
  Sakiusa Matadigo (Nantes)
  Craig McMullen (Unattached, short term contract)
  Gordon Ross (Castres Olympique)
  Brent Russell (Stormers)
  Edd Thrower (London Wasps)   
  D. T. H. van der Merwe (on loan from Rugby Canada)

Players out
  Ben Broster (Llanelli Scarlets)
 (Ireland) Shane Byrne (released)
  Thomas Castaignède (retired)
  Tomás de Vedia (London Irish)
  Ben Johnston (CA Brive)
  Simon Raiwalui (Racing Metro)
  Ben Russell (Racing Metro)
  Tevita Vaikona (released)

Squad

Guinness Premiership
The loss of Glen Jackson and Brent Russell for the opening of the season due to pre-season injuries represented a significant blow to the club, but nonetheless the season began well with a return to winning ways against Wasps in the opening day London double-header. Defeat at the first home game by early pace setters Gloucester brought the team down to earth, before a solid away win at struggling Leeds, revenge for the previous season's home and away defeats away at Worcester, and a win back at Vicarage Road over Leicester. Defensive frailties saw Saracens go into the Autumn Premiership break for cup matches third in the table, but also with the third worst defensive record, after a defeat away at Sale.

The brief return of the Premiership action at the end of November nestled between two phases of EDF Energy and Heineken Cup action saw Saracens come away with a hard-fought win against London Irish in a game where the lead changed hands several times, with never more than a score between the teams.

The return to Premiership action over Christmas and the New Year began well for Saracens with a win away at London rivals Harlequins in chilly conditions at the Stoop. Saracens, once again though, were not able to put their regular Christmas period malaise behind them against a talented but under-performing Newcastle side back at Vicarage Road, as defensive weaknesses and coming out of the blocks slowly saw Saracens take only a losing bonus point from their final fixture of 2007 in the Premiership, though it was enough to see them go into the New Year in third place in the domestic league.

The buildup to the first game of 2008 was dominated by talk away from the field of play, with the news that former Wallaby coach Eddie Jones was to succeed Alan Gaffney at the top of the coaching subject with Gaffney adopting the same consulting role Jones had been providing, whilst rumours of substantial cash investment from South African rugby interests abounded.

When the focus returned to on-field matters, Saracens suffered a second successive defeat in the Premiership, this time away at Bristol, failing to take even a losing bonus point for the first time in any competition in the season and raising fears of the all too familiar Saracens' winter slump. Only the outcome of other games allowed Saracens to slip only one place to fourth place.

Heineken Cup
Saracens' return to Heineken Cup action also saw the return of Glasgow Warriors to Vicarge Road for the opening game of their European Campaign, a team they met both in group action and at the quarter-final stage in the European Challenge Cup of the previous season. As in the two home games against the same team in the previous season, Saracens ran out bonus point winners but with defensive frailties causing anxious moments going into the final minutes of the game.

Saracens' luck did not hold the following week when they travelled to face Biarritz Olympique. Having been ahead several times during the game, they finally went down to a single point defeat when Biarritz scored a penalty from near the half-way line in the dying moments of the game and despite outscoring their opponents by three tries to one had to settle for a losing bonus point.

The visit of Viadana the following month saw Saracens notch up a comfortable win in a game that  saw the first team debut of both Chris Jack and Brent Russell. Russell was to win the man of the match for award in a game that saw Saracens outclass their opponents by ten tries to one despite very bad weather conditions.

With Glasgow edging out Biarritz in tight game the following day, Saracens record of taking a bonus point of some description from every game saw them top the pool table at the halfway point ahead of their French and Scottish rivals, all three on a record of two wins and a defeat.

Viadana looked to avenge their 71-7 defeat at Vicarage Road the following week in the return fixture in Italy, making ten changes to their starting line-up. These changes appeared to deliver results for Viadana with the home side going into the half-time break with the four-try bonus point already secured and a single penalty from Glen Jackson the only score for Saracens to leave a 23-point deficit. Saracens though were to show composure in a second half, in which they played to their strengths and scored 31 unanswered points, more than half from the boot of Glen Jackson, to take the game and keep them at the top of the table at the end of the weekend.

Saracens qualified for the quarter-finals for the first time in their history and were drawn at home to Ospreys. Despite being underdogs, Saracens' won 19-10 with a try from Francisco Leonelli and 14 points from the boot of fly-half Glen Jackson. In the semi-final, Saracens were narrowly beaten by eventual winners Munster at the Ricoh Arena.

EDF Energy Cup
The first round of cup competition saw Saracens win comfortably away at Leeds in the EDF Energy Cup, despite conceding four tries. Another bonus point win over Bristol back at Vicarage Road positioned Saracens well with maximum points ahead of a difficult away trip to Llanelli.

After the break for Heineken Cup action and a single round of Premiership action, Saracens failed once again to win away in Wales, but taking a losing bonus point and a try bonus too was enough to see them qualify for the semi-final stage for the first time in their Anglo-Welsh cup history, ahead of their opponents Llanelli Scarlets.

In the semi-final at the Millennium Stadium, Saracens were beaten 30-3 by Ospreys. Glen Jackson scored the team's only points with a penalty in the second half.

Results

Sources
 History of Saracens
 'The Saracen', Matchday programmes 2007-08

External links

 Official site
 Fansite

2007-08
2007–08 Heineken Cup by team
2007–08 English Premiership (rugby union)

de:Saracens
fr:Saracens (rugby)
it:Saracens F.C.
ja:サラセンズ
sv:Saracens F.C.